The  is a limited express train service that runs between  and  in Hokkaido, operated by Hokkaido Railway Company (JR Hokkaido). The journey time of the Hokuto is approximately 3 hours 40 minutes.

Super Hokuto services started on 1 March 1994, and cut journey time by about 30 minutes due to the higher speeds through the many curves of the line between Sapporo and Hakodate. All trains have been renamed to Hokuto since 2020, after the KiHa 183 series used on the original Hokuto service was replaced with KiHa 261 series.

Stops
Trains stop at the following stations:

Rolling stock
The Hokuto is operated by 7-car KiHa 261 series DMUs, with car 1 at the Hakodate (southern) end. All cars are no-smoking. Until 30 September 2022, the Hokuto was also operated by KiHa 281 series DMUs.

For departures using KiHa 281 series, cars 1, 2 and 4 to 7 were ordinary-class cars with 2+2 seating, and car 3 was a "Green" car with 2+1 seating.

For departures using KiHa 261 series, car 1 is a "Green" car with 2+1 seating, and cars 2 to 7 are ordinary-class cars with 2+2 seating.

References

External links

 JR Hokkaido KiHa 281/283 Super Hokuto train information 

Hokkaido Railway Company
Named passenger trains of Japan
Railway services introduced in 1949